Ma Jolie may refer to:

Ma Jolie (1912), Cubist painting by Pablo Picasso currently located in New York City
Ma Jolie (1914), oil painting by Pablo Picasso currently located in Indianapolis